In the Hindu epic Mahabharata, the Upapandavas (lit. junior Pandavas), also known as Pandavaputras (lit. sons of Pandavas), Draupadeyas or Panchakumaras (lit. five sons) are the five sons of Queen Draupadi from each of the five Pandavas. They are Prativindhya, Sutasoma, Shrutakarma, Shatanika and Shrutasena. They were Atirathis, as mentioned by Bhishma, and fought the Kurukshetra war on the side of the Pandavas and slew many enemy warriors. They were as ferocious as their fathers but other than that, not much is said in the Mahabharata about the brothers. They were very strong and they were only defeated by remarkably few Kaurava warriors.

They had half and full paternal brothers, 3 of whom - Abhimanyu, Ghatotkacha and Iravan, also fought in the War. All 8 of these brothers perished in the battle.

The Upapandavas, along with Abhimanyu, also battled the demon king Alambusha, on the 9th day but they were all defeated by Alambusha and Abhimanyu had to come to their rescue. On the 11th day, Nakula's son Shatanika was defeated by Vrihasena, the son of Karna.

Prativindhya
Prativindhya (lit. shining like the sun or towards Vindhya) or Shrutavindhya (lit. related to the Buddhi) was son of Yudhishthira and Draupadi and was the eldest of the Upapandavas. He was described to be a skilled fighter, known to face troops like "the thunder-wielding Shakra (Indra)".
In the Kurukshetra War, Prativindhya fought Shakuni. On the 9th day, Prativindhya struck Alambusha unconscious.

On the 14th night, he fought some of the Kauravas along with Sutasoma. On the 15th day, he stopped Ashwatthama's advance by holding him off long enough but ultimately had to retreat from the battle after being overpowered by Drauni. He killed Chitra, the king of Abhisara, on the 16th day.

He had a son Yaudheya, according to Matsya Purana.

Sutasoma
 (lit one who has extracted soma or the one who has the beauty of the moon) was son of Bhima and Draupadi, second of the Upapandavas. He excelled in Mace fighting and archery. He battled the Kaurava prince Vikarna on the first day of the war. He played a major role in the battle by nearly killing Shakuni. Sutasoma, on the 12th day, stopped the advance of the mighty Kaurava Vivismati, towards Dronacharya. He also battled some of the Kauravas on the 14th night, accompanied by his half-brother Prativindhya. He played a major role along with Yudhishthira and other Upapandavas in holding off Dushasana and the other Kauravas on the 15th day.

Shatanika
Shatanika (lit. he who has hundred troops) was the son of Nakula and Draupadi. He was the third of the Upapandavas. He was named after a famous Rajarshi in the Kuru lineage who was considered to be an avatar of Visvadevas. He was nominated as a deputy commander-in-chief under his maternal uncle and teacher Dhrishtadyumna, in charge of Vyuha planning. He massacred the army of Kaurava ally Bhutakarma, as well as Bhutakarma. Shatanika also defeated Kaurava prince Dushkarna on the 6th day. On the 11th day he was defeated by Karna’s son Vrihasena. He defeated the Kauravas Jayatsena, Chitrasena and Shrutakarman and killed a prince of Kalinga. Shatanika caused huge destruction of the Kaurava army on the 17th day too.

Shrutasena
Shrutsena (lit. the commander of the army of celestials) was son of Sahadeva and Draupadi and the fourth of the Upapandavas; like his father he was smart and intelligent. In the Chatahurdi analysis of the Mahabharata, he was defeated by Shakuni during the battle; he killed Shala, the younger brother of Bhurishravas on the 14th day of the war. He fought with other warriors like Dushmanara and Durmukha and defeated them. He also killed the son of Kaurava warrior Devavraddha.

Shrutakarma
Shrutakarma (lit. he who is known for his good deeds) was the son of Arjuna and Draupadi, and the youngest of the Upapandavas. His horses were supposed to bear the colour of kingfishers. He was a capable archer like his father and defeated Kamboja ruler Sudakshina on the first day. He also defeated the Kaurava Jayatsena on the 6th day. He fought against Dushasana and Ashwathama in an archery duel in the battle and gave them a good fight. He killed King Chitrasena, another king of Abhisara, on the 16th day.

Order of their birth
The order of birth of the Upapandavas was not the same as that of their fathers.

1. Prativindhya - sired by Yudhishthira

2. Sutasoma - sired by Bhima

3. Shatanika - sired by Nakula

4. Shrutasena - sired by Sahadeva

5. Shrutakarma - sired by Arjuna

This is because, the first 4 children of Draupadi were born during the first exile of Arjuna. After begetting sons from the eldest 2 Pandavas, it is Nakula's turn to enter Draupadi's chambers, and after him, is Sahadeva's turn. After Arjuna returns from his exile, he sires Shrutakarma with Draupadi.

Death

On the last night of the war after Duryodhana's death and the Kauravas' defeat, Ashwathama gathered the only other surviving Kaurava warriors - Kritavarma and Kripacharya, and attacked the Pandava camp. He killed Dhrishtadyumna and many other prominent warriors of the Pandava army while they were sleeping or tried to fight him back.

Ashwatthama killed all the Upapandavas who were awake by then along with Shikhandi when they came out of their chambers after hearing 
the screams of other soldiers to fight Ashwatthama. In some versions of the story, he believes them to be the five Pandava brothers due to darkness; in others, he purposefully attacks the Pandavas' heirs in order to hurt the Pandavas emotionally by destroying their lineage.

Ashwatthama was eventually cursed by Krishna for his heinous act of attempting to kill the baby Parikshit in the womb of Uttara, to roam the world for 3000 years with loneliness, incurable bruises and ulcers.

In the Jataka tales version of the Mahabharata, Parikshit's mentors included Sutasoma. Prativindhya, Shrutakarma, and Shatanika at least (who even in Sauptika Parva is shown as wounded not dead) have definite longer lives in Jatakas.

Citations

Characters in the Mahabharata